The King of Romance is a 2016 Taiwanese television series created and produced by Eastern Television. It stars Lego Li, Cindy Lien, Gabriel Lan and Serena Fang. First original broadcast began on December 3, 2016 on TTV airing every Saturday night at 10:00-11:30 pm.

Synopsis
A popular Chinese folklore tells of how the Jade Emperor, the king of gods, expelled the angels Golden Boy and Jade Girl from heaven to the human world. There, they are cursed to a romance that spans seven lives, during which they could never be together. Gao Bing Bing (Cindy Lien) is a modern-day woman who believes she is the reincarnated Jade Girl. When she is reunited with two childhood friends, Wang Zhen (Lego Lee) and Li Ru Long (Gabriel Lan), can she determine which is her Golden Boy and break the ancient curse?

Cast

Main cast
Lego Lee as Wang Nuo / Wang Zhen 
Roy Tu as young Wang Nuo / young Wang Zhen
Li Bin s young Wang Nuo / young Wang Zhen (stand-in)
Cindy Lien as Gao Bing Bing 
Wang Cai Han as young Bing Bing
Gabriel Lan as Li Ru Long （Bruce Li）
Serena Fang as Shen Yi Le 
Ricie Fun as Ren Ai Zhen

Supporting cast
Yankee Yang as Fang Wen Qing (Xiao Fang) 
Una Lu as Wu Bai He
Angel Ho as Ah Meng 
Titan Huang as Ding Xiao Qiang 
Fang Yu Xin as Qin Ai Bao 
Wu Fan as Wang Nuo and Wang Zhen’s father
Tang Chih-wei as Ai Zhen’s father
Lin Shi En as Bing Bing’s father
Peace Yang as Wang Min 
High Ka as Ah Hong 
Liao Hai Cheng as Ah Qi 
Money Chien as Gui Lian

Cameo
Hsiao-Lao Lin as Zhou Xiu Qin 
Cai Cheng Yi as plumber
Yang Sheng Da as Da Pang 
Liu Guo Shao as Lu Rui Yang (Xiao Lu) 
Lin Rou Jun as Ah Xing 
Lai Pei En as nursing staff
Lin Shu Han (Ah Tui) as nursing staff
Jin Mei Man as Grandma Wu 
Lin Mo Xi as Pei Pei

Soundtrack
It’s You by Elvis Tian 
Broken Heart 不要再見面 by Elvis Tian 
Pinky Swear 打勾勾 by Elvis Tian 
The One 唯一 by Lego Lee
Fade Out 句點 by Wang Yan Wei 
Goodbye 忙著說再見 by Yan Li Fei 
Girls Can Too by Tyler Van Den Berg
One by Greg Nicholoson

Broadcast

Episode ratings

References

External links
The King of Romance TTV Website 
The King of Romance EBC Website 
 

2016 Taiwanese television series debuts
2017 Taiwanese television series endings
Eastern Television original programming
Taiwan Television original programming